Melbourne Street is a street situated in the Adelaide suburb of North Adelaide, South Australia. It is the main commercial area of the second-largest of the three grids that comprise North Adelaide. It was named after William Lamb, 2nd Viscount Melbourne (after whom Melbourne is also named), who was British Prime Minister when the South Australia Foundation Act received parliamentary approval.

Melbourne Street is bracketed by Brougham Place and Mann Road and runs in a north-easterly direction. It principally consists of cafes, restaurants, boutique businesses and retail shops. The street also contains many colonial-era buildings. Two of the well-known buildings on the street are The Old Lion Hotel, which was built as part of a brewery and is now a fashionable public house, and Buffalo Cottage, which was built in 1851. St Ann's College is also located nearby.

See also

References

External links
Melbourne Street Precinct
Postcards: Off Melbourne Street

Streets in Adelaide
North Adelaide